Giuseppe Marchioro (born 13 March 1936) is an Italian professional former footballer and manager.

Career

Footballer

As a footballer, he grew up in A.C. Milan youth team, winning a Torneo di Viareggio in 1957. Later, he played only in lower Italian categories. With Catanzaro he reached a Coppa Italia final in 1966, scoring a goal in the last match against Fiorentina.

Coach

Between 1968 and 1970 he attended Liedholm and Radice during their work in Monza.

He began to coach on 1970, training Verbania. In 1973, with Alessandria, he won the first edition of Coppa Italia Semiprofessionisti (now Coppa Italia Lega Pro). In 1975 his Como was promoted in Serie A; next year led Cesena for the first time in UEFA Cup.

After a delusive first experience in a top club (Milan, season 1976–77), he coached in lower series. In 1988, he signed for Reggiana, which he led for few years from Serie C1 to A.

He retired in 1997.

References

1936 births
Living people
Footballers from Milan
Association football forwards
Italian footballers
Serie A managers
Italian football managers
U.S. Catanzaro 1929 players
S.S.D. Varese Calcio players
A.C. Legnano players
U.S. Alessandria Calcio 1912 managers
Como 1907 managers
A.C. Cesena managers
A.C. Milan managers
U.S. Avellino 1912 managers
A.C. Ancona managers
Calcio Foggia 1920 managers
A.C. Reggiana 1919 managers
Genoa C.F.C. managers
Venezia F.C. managers
U.S. Triestina Calcio 1918 managers